Johannes François Snelleman (Rotterdam, 26 December 1852 – The Hague, 18 May 1938) was a Dutch zoologist, orientalist, ethnographer and museum director. He was a son of Christiaan Snelleman and Sara Lacombe. Snelleman was married three times, to Josepha Hendrika Dupont (1860-1899), Catharina Johanna Elisabeth Augusta Inckel (born  1870), and Theodora Maria Beun (1887-1964).

Expeditions and publications

Between 1887 and 1889 Snelleman participated as zoologist in a scientific expedition to Central Sumatra (Netherlands East Indies), with the objective to map the Hari River basin to do research into the natural environment and the people. The expedition, organised by the Royal Netherlands Geographical Society, was led by lieutenant Johannes Schouw Santvoort, Royal Dutch Navy, with members D.D. Veth (son of KNAG chairman P.J. Veth) and A.L. van Hasselt. Snelleman wrote a book about the expedition.

After the Sumatra Expedition Snelleman and Veth senior and junior kept a close contact. During a later KNAG expedition in Angola in 1884/'85, D.D. Veth died of exhaustion. Together with his father P.J. Veth Snelleman wrote a book about D.D. Veth and the expedition in South West Africa. Later, Snelleman would cooperate in a book series published by Veth, and titled Java, geographisch, ethnologisch, historisch (Java: geography, ethnography, history).

Snelleman was editor of the four volume Encyclopaedie van Nederlandsch-Indië (Encyclopedia the Netherlands Indies), started in 1896 with P.A. van der Lith as sole editor. Snelleman cooperated with Van der Lith on volume two (1899) and became joint editor for volume three (1902). After the death of Van der Lith in March 1901, Snelleman completed the final volume (1905) as sole editor.

With the same Benjamins, Snelleman started the journal :nl:De West-Indische Gids (West Indian Guide) in 1919.

Museum director

In the (late?) 1880s and 1890s, Snelleman was curator of the Museum voor Volkenkunde National Museum of Ethnology in Leiden.

In 1901 Snelleman was appointed director of the Ethnologisch Museum (Ethnological Museum) in Rotterdam (later named Museum voor Land- en Volkenkunde and currently Wereldmuseum Rotterdam) and the Maritiem Museum 'Prins Hendrik' (Maritime Museum 'Prince Hendrik') in that city. These two, thematically unconnected museums, were placed under a single directorship in 1885. He kept this position until early 1915, when he took his retirement due to ill-health.

Bibliography (selection)
 Bijdragen tot de kennis der fauna van Midden-Sumatra - deel 1, 1887 (with others)
 Daniël Veth's reizen in Angola, voorafgegaan door eene schets van zijn leven, 1887, (P.J. Veth and Joh. F. Snelleman)
 Industrie des Cafres du Sud-Est de l'Afrique. Collection recueillie sur les lieux et notice ethnographique par H.P.N. Muller, Description des objets représentés par J.F. Snelleman, 1892 (with H.P.N. Muller)
 Encyclopaedie van Nederlandsch-Indië, vol. 2 (1899) as editorial assistant, vol. 3 (1902) (joint editor with P.A. van der Lith, vol. 4 (1905) (sole editor)
 Bijdragen tot de kennis der fauna van Midden-Sumatra - vol. 2, 1892 (with others)
 Encyclopædie van Nederlandsch West-Indië, 1914-1917, editors H.D. Benjamins en Joh. F. Snelleman
 Scheepvaart-musea en Rotterdamsche toestanden, 1916
 Het Ethnologisch Museum van Rotterdam, 1917

References

Footnotes

Sources
 Nieuwe Rotterdamsche Courant, 6 May 1915 (Dutch)
 Nieuwe Rotterdamsche Courant, 4 August 1915 (Dutch)
 Het Vaderland, 21 May 1938 (Dutch)
 Genealogical information Johannes François Snelleman

External links
 Midden-Sumatra-expeditie 1877 - 1879
 Encyclopaedie van Nederlandsch West-Indië (online version Digitale Bibliotheek voor de Nederlandse Letteren (Digital Library of Dutch Literature))
 
 

Dutch anthropologists
Dutch zoologists
Dutch geographers
Directors of museums in the Netherlands
Scientists from Rotterdam
1852 births
1938 deaths